This is a list of the longest-running Philippine television series, ordered by number of years the show has been aired. This list includes only programs aired ten years and above. Some shows listed below include the years that the show did not air.

Legend

50–59 years

40–49 years

30–39 years

20–29 years

10–19 years

See also
Lists of longest-running U.S. shows by broadcast type:
 List of longest-running United States television series
 List of longest-running U.S. cable television series
 List of longest-running U.S. broadcast network television series
 List of longest-running U.S. primetime television series
 List of longest-running U.S. first-run syndicated television series
Lists of longest-running shows internationally:
 List of longest-running television shows by category - international list
 List of longest-running Indian television series
 List of longest-running UK television series
 List of longest-running Australian television series
 List of longest-running Spanish television series

References

Lists of Philippine television series
Philippine